Jean-Paul Cointet is a French historian. He is Professor emeritus of 20th century history at the University of Picardie Jules Verne in Amiens, and he serves on the board of the Institut Georges Pompidou. He was the recipient of two prizes from the Académie française: the Prix d’Académie in 1999, and the Prix Thiers for Hippolyte Taine : Un regard sur la France in 2012.

Works

References

Living people
20th-century French historians
Historians of Vichy France
French biographers
Year of birth missing (living people)
21st-century French historians